Hoxne Rural District was a rural district within the administrative county of East Suffolk between 1894 and 1934. It was created out of the earlier Hoxne rural sanitary district. It was named after the historic hundred of Hoxne, whose boundaries it closely matched. The hundred, in turn, took its name from the village of Hoxne.

In 1934, under a County Review Order, Hoxne Rural District was abolished and its parishes transferred to Hartismere Rural District, and in 1974 to Mid Suffolk district. 3 parishes went into the new Blyth Rural District.

Statistics

Parishes
Parishes which would be transferred to Hartismere RD: Athelington, Bedfield, Bedingfield, Brundish, Denham, Fressingfield, Horham, Hoxne, Laxfield, Mendham, Metfield, Monk Soham, Southolt, Stradbroke, Syleham, Tannington, Weybread, Wilby, Wingfield, Worlingworth.

Transferred to Blyth RD: Badingham, Dennington, Saxtead

References

History of Suffolk
Districts of England created by the Local Government Act 1894
Rural districts of England